Amblyceps is a genus of fish in the family Amblycipitidae. The genera Amblyceps and Liobagrus are sister group pair that is, in turn, sister to Xiurenbagrus. These species are easily distinguished by the presence of pinnate processes along with the median caudal-fin rays (although these processes may be poorly developed in some species), a prominent cup-like skin flap above the base of the pectoral spine, and the adipose fin largely separate from the caudal fin. In most species the caudal fin is deeply forked; A. apangi and A. murraystuarti differ in having their caudal fin truncate. Amblyceps species may reach about 100 millimetres (3.94 in) SL.

Distribution and habitat
These species are distributed throughout south and southeast Asia. They typically inhabit fast flowing hill streams or fast-flowing stretches of larger rivers. This genus is mainly distributed in India and the Malay Peninsula. Three species are known from Myanmar: A. caecutiens, A. murraystuarti and A. carinatum.

Species
There are currently 21 recognized species in this genus:
 Amblyceps accari Dahanukar, Raghavan, A. Ali & Britz, 2016 
 Amblyceps apangi Nath & S. C. Dey, 1989
 Amblyceps arunachalensis Nath & S. C. Dey, 1989
 Amblyceps caecutiens Blyth, 1858
 Amblyceps carinatum H. H. Ng, 2005 
 Amblyceps cerinum H. H. Ng & J. J. Wright, 2010 
 Amblyceps foratum H. H. Ng & Kottelat, 2000
 Amblyceps kurzii (F. Day, 1872)
 Amblyceps laticeps (McClelland, 1842)
 Amblyceps macropterus H. H. Ng, 2001
 Amblyceps mangois (F. Hamilton, 1822) (Indian torrent catfish)
 Amblyceps murraystuarti B. L. Chaudhuri, 1919
 Amblyceps platycephalus H. H. Ng & Kottelat, 2000
 Amblyceps protentum H. H. Ng & J. J. Wright, 2009
 Amblyceps serratum H. H. Ng & Kottelat, 2000
 Amblyceps tenuispinis Blyth, 1860
 Amblyceps torrentis Linthoingambi & Vishwanath, 2008 
 Amblyceps tuberculatum Linthoingambi & Vishwanath, 2008 
 Amblyceps variegatum H. H. Ng & Kottelat, 2000
 Amblyceps waikhomi Darshan, Kachari, Dutta, Ganguly & D. N. Das, 2016 
 Amblyceps yunnanensis X. Y. Zhang, Y. Long, H. Xiao & Z. M. Chen, 2016

References

Amblycipitidae
Fish of South Asia
Fish of Southeast Asia
Catfish genera
Taxa named by Edward Blyth
Freshwater fish genera